Dropull i Sipërm (Ano Dropoli) is a former municipality in the Gjirokastër County, southern Albania. At the 2015 local government reform it became a subdivision of the municipality Dropull. The population at the 2011 census was 971. The municipal unit is inhabited by ethnic Greeks.

Settlements 

Bodrishtë (Βόδριστα)
Bularat (Βουλιαράτι or Βουλιαράτες)
Dritë (Άγιος Νικόλας)
Jorgucat (Γεωργουτσάτι or Γεωργουτσάτες)
Kërrë (Κουρά or Κρα)
Klishar (Κλεισάρι)
Kakavijë (Κακαβιά)
Koshovicë (Κοσοβίτσα or Κοσσοβίτσα)
Krioner (Κρυονέρι)
Likomil (Λυκομίλι or Γλυκομίλι)
Llongo (Λόγγος)
Llovinë (Λοβίνα)
Pepel (Πέπελη)
Selo (Σελλιό)
 (Σωτήρα)
 (Βοδίνο)
Vrisera (Βρυσερά)
Zervat (Ζερβάτι)

See also
 Dropull
 Dropull i Poshtëm
 Greeks in Albania

References 

Former municipalities in Gjirokastër County
Epirus
Administrative units of Dropull